Pseudodaphnella cnephaea is a species of sea snail, a marine gastropod mollusk in the family Raphitomidae.

Description
The length of the shell attains 4.75 mm, its diameter 1.5 mm.

The short, solid shell has a fusiform shape. It is corrugate. The shell contains six to seven, slightly ventricose whorls with squarely crossed ribs, both longitudinal and transverse of equal thickness, not many in number, say thirteen on the body whorl, crossed by eleven, of which two spiral lirae below the suture are approximate. The aperture is oblong. The outer lip is denticulate within. The columellar margin stands upright. The sinus does not extend beyond the middle of the outer lip. A completely unicolorous species, being either pale or dark blackish-brown, the latter predominating.

Distribution
This marine species occurs off New Caledonia

References

 Bouge, L.J. & Dautzenberg, P.L. 1914. Les Pleurotomides de la Nouvelle-Caledonie et de ses dependances. Journal de Conchyliologie 61: 123–214

External links
  Kilburn, R. N. (2009). Genus Kermia (Mollusca: Gastropoda: Conoidea: Conidae: Raphitominae) in South African Waters, with Observations on the Identities of Related Extralimital Species. African Invertebrates. 50(2): 217-236
 
 Gastropods.com: Pseudodaphnella cnephaea

cnephaea
Gastropods described in 1896